FIF may refer to:

Sport 
 Frederiksberg IF, a Danish sports club
 Italian Football Federation, (Italian: formerly )
 Ivorian Football Federation

Other uses 
 Falah-e-Insaniat Foundation, Pakistani charity
 Air Finland, a defunct airline
 Federation of Irish Fishermen
 Fetus in fetu, developmental abnormality
 FiF file format
 Fife, historic county in Scotland, Chapman code
 Five Iron Frenzy, an American Christian ska band
 Forced inspiratory flow
 Forward in Faith, a movement within the Anglican Communion
 Falkland Islands Foundation, now part of Falklands Conservation